Willock is a surname.  People having this surname include

Andy Willock (b. 1964), a former English football midfielder
Bernie Willock, a Canadian cyclist and businessman
Brad Willock (b. 1962), a Canadian volleyball player
Calum Willock (b. 1981), a Kittitian international footballer
Erinne Willock (b. 1981), a Canadian cyclist
Colin Willock (1919–2005), a magazine editor and a nature documentary producer
Dave Willock (1909–1990), an American character actor
Joe Willock (b. 1999), an English football midfielder, currently at Newcastle
John Willock also (Willocks) (1515 – 1585), Scottish reformer
 Lieutenant-Colonel Sir Henry Willock, British Envoy to Persia 1815-1826
 Martin Willock (b. 1954), a Canadian cyclist